Disco lights may refer to:

Music
"Discolights", a song by Ultrabeat and Darren Styles.
Discolights: The Album, a 2008 album by Ultrabeat.

Entertainment Lighting
 DJ lighting
 Stage lighting
 Intelligent lighting
 Martin Light